Summa Irunga Machan is a 1996 Indian Tamil-language comedy film directed by S. N. Prasad. The film stars Pandiarajan, Pragathi and Divyasri, with Malaysia Vasudevan, Kovai Sarala, Kavitha, Charle and Alex playing supporting roles. It was released on 15 March 1996.

Plot

Subramani is a jobless youth living in a remote village. He leaves his village to rejoin his uncle in Chennai. To his surprise, his uncle has two wives : Paramu and Rajamma, they live in different houses and his uncle struggles between his two wives. Paramu's daughter is Uma and Rajamma's daughter is Rama, both study in the same college. Subramani's uncle advises him to hide his identity and to act as a servant, Paramu and Rajamma hire them. Uma and Rama fall in love with Subramani. Unlike his uncle, Subramani is against polygamy. What transpires next forms the rest of the story.

Cast

Pandiarajan as Subramani
Pragathi as Uma
Divyasri as Rama
Malaysia Vasudevan as Subramani's uncle
Kovai Sarala as Paramu
Kavitha as Rajamma
Charle as Sigamani
Alex
Loose Mohan
Thideer Kannaiah
Pragatheesh
Bharathan
Vinayak Raj 
Babu
Premi
Shoruba
Manimekalai
Master Padusha
Deva in a guest appearance

Soundtrack

The music was composed by Deva, with lyrics written by Kalidasan.

References

External links 

 

1996 films
1990s Tamil-language films
Indian comedy films
Films scored by Deva (composer)
1996 comedy films